Info Plus or Info+ is a Bosnian local commercial Cable television channel based in Gradiška, Bosnia and Herzegovina. The program is mainly produced in Serbian and it is available in Bosanska Posavina area.

References

External links 
 www.gradiska.tv (Official website)

Television stations in Bosnia and Herzegovina
Television channels and stations established in 2004